Josh Lunden (born  February 24, 1986) is a Canadian professional ice hockey player. He is currently under contract to Ducs d'Angers of the Ligue Magnus.
On March 20, 2010, the Phoenix Coyotes of the National Hockey League signed Lunden to an entry level contract.

Lunden played two seasons under contract to the St. John's IceCaps of the American Hockey League before signing his first contract abroad with Russian second division club, Rubin Tyumen of the Higher Hockey League on September 16, 2014. Mid-season Lunden transferred from Tyumen to German club, ESV Kaufbeuren in the DEL2.

On July 1, 2015, Lunden signed a one-year contract with French outfit Ducs d'Angers of the Ligue Magnus.

References

External links

1986 births
Living people
Alaska Anchorage Seawolves men's ice hockey players
Chilliwack Chiefs players
Canadian ice hockey left wingers
Houston Aeros (1994–2013) players
Ice hockey people from British Columbia
ESV Kaufbeuren players
Las Vegas Wranglers players
People from Coquitlam
Peoria Rivermen (AHL) players
San Antonio Rampage players
St. John's IceCaps players
Canadian expatriate ice hockey players in Germany